The Line 1 of Wuhan Metro is an elevated metro line in the city of Wuhan, Hubei. It is the longest continuous metro viaduct in the world. Line 1 opened on 28 July 2004, making Wuhan the fifth city in mainland China to have a metro system after Beijing, Tianjin, Shanghai and Guangzhou. This is the first Metro line in China incorrectly referred to as a light rail line in Chinese terminology because it is elevated. Originally a branch line was planned to cross the Yangtze to Wuchang District via the Second Wuhan Yangtze River Bridge. The Second Wuhan River Bridge even had a provision in the central median where Line 1 trains would run in anticipation for the branch line when it opened in 1995. However by 2003 the reservation was removed to allow for more traffic lanes when the bridge was undergoing renovation.

History
May 28, 2014: Hankou North extension opened.
Sept 17, 2014:  opened.
Dec 26, 2017: Extension to Jinghe opened.

Stations
Phase 1 stations are (from west to east): Zongguan, Taipingyang, Qiaokoulu, Chongrenlu, Lijibeilu, Youyilu, Xunlimen (originally Jianghanlu, connection with future Line 2; not to confuse with the future Jianghanlu station of Line 2), Dazhilu, Sanyanglu, Huangpulu.

Line 1, Phase 2 stations from west to east are Jinshandadao (not open yet), Dongwudadao, Wuhuandadao, Etouwan, Zhuyehai, Duoluokou, Gutianyilu, Gutianerlu, Gutiansanlu, Gutiansilu and Hanxiyilu to the West of Zongguan and Toudaojie, Erqilu, Xuzhouxincun, Danshuichi, Xinrong (originally Chalukou) and Dijiao to the East of Huangpulu (station names changed according to official system map and schedule).

All translation of station names are according to official translation.

Operation
Beginning May 28, 2014, every other train will reach Hankou North Station as the northern terminus; others will terminate at Dijiao Station.

Rolling stock 

Traction power is provided by a third rail collected by bottom contact contact shoes on the train. A full train provides 176 seats, and can carry 1,276 passengers by Chinese regulation of 9 people per square meter.

See also 
Wuhan Metro
Wuhan

References

Railway lines opened in 2004
 
2004 establishments in China